Pagyda pullalis is a moth in the family Crambidae. It was described by Swinhoe in 1903. It is found in Thailand.

References

Moths described in 1903
Pyraustinae